Proud Like a God is the debut album by the German alternative rock band Guano Apes. The album was released in Germany on 6 October 1997 via GUN/Supersonic Records, internationally on 24 December 1997 via GUN/Supersonic and BMG International, and finally in the US on 28 September 1999 via RCA Records and BMG International. Two of Guano Apes' most popular and enduring songs are included on this album: "Open Your Eyes" and "Lords of the Boards", which peaked at #5 and #10 on the German charts, respectively.

The album has been certified Platinum for shipping 200,000 copies in both Germany and Switzerland.

Background
After winning the "Local Heroes" talent contest in 1996, Guano Apes entered Horus Studio in Hannover to record their debut album, and signed a record deal with GUN Records, a division of BMG. In the 2005 documentary Planet of the Apes, drummer Dennis Poschwatta called the recording process "a really bad experience", since the band hadn't realized that recording an album is substantially different from performing live. Vocalist Sandra Nasić, on the other hand, found working in the studio "interesting" and remembered how it made her feel respected as a singer, while guitarist Henning Rümenapp described it as "on-the-job training".

In August 1997, "Open Your Eyes" was released as a single, followed in 1998 by "Rain" and "Lords Of The Boards".

Track listing

20th Anniversary Edition

October 2017 saw the release of Proud Like a God XX, a revamped 2CD version of the original album containing remixed versions of 10 songs, plus the previously unreleased track "Score". The second disc contains thoroughly rearranged "2017 versions" of six songs from Proud Like A God, and three newly recorded cover songs. The track "Lose Yourself" was released as a single.

Personnel

Band
 Sandra Nasić - Vocals
 Henning Rümenapp - guitars
 Stefan Ude - bass
 Dennis Poschwatta - drums, vocals

Additional musicians
 Afam - scratches
 Geo Schaller - keys, programming
 Smoke - cello
 Michael Wolpers - percussion

Production
 Wolfgang Stach - production (except "Lords of the Boards"), engineering
 Guano Apes - production ("Lords of the Boards")
 Ronald Prent - mixing
 Anyway Wölfle - additional engineering

Reception
CMJ gave a favourable review, praising Sandra Nasić's vocal range and calling the album a "well-blended mix of sweet pop and bruising rock, with a little bit of electronica-informed loops and ambience thrown in for good measure."

Charts

Year-end charts

Certifications

References

External links

1997 debut albums
Guano Apes albums
GUN Records albums